"Unconfirmed Reports" is the second episode of the fifth season of the HBO original series The Wire. The episode was written by William F. Zorzi from a story by David Simon & William F. Zorzi and was directed by Ernest Dickerson. It originally aired on 13 January 2008.

Plot

At a Narcotics Anonymous meeting, Bubbles follows a speaker named Dee-Dee who discusses her struggle with her inner addict and personal code. Bubbles is engaging and humorous, but unable to discuss an emotional memory. Walon tries to convince him to share the tragedy of Sherrod's death in order to move on, and persuades him to fill his time by volunteering at a soup kitchen. At The Baltimore Sun, Templeton plans a color piece about the Baltimore Orioles opening game, but fails to find a suitable subject. He returns with an unverifiable story about an orphaned wheelchair user truanting to attend. Gus is concerned about the piece's lack of corroboration, but is forced to print it after executive editor James Whiting gives his approval. Later, desk editor Rebecca Corbett also questions the authenticity of the story, but Gus tells her there's nothing he can do.

Marlo decides to reassert his authority and orders several murders. Partlow, Snoop, and Michael watch the house of a target named June Bug, who has spread rumors that Marlo is homosexual. Michael questions the necessity of the murder of an entire family for a possible insult, but is admonished by Snoop for second-guessing Marlo. Partlow and Snoop disable the street's security cameras, stage a home invasion, and kill the three adults inside. Michael lets a child escape and is disgusted by the entire operation. Later, Detective Kima Greggs finds a second child hiding in the home. She picks up the child and leaves the building. Marlo visits Serge in prison and finds Avon Barksdale waiting in his place. Avon tells Marlo that in order for him to talk to Serge, he has to give Avon's sister Brianna $100,000. Marlo agrees and convinces Serge to give him a line to Spiros Vondas.

Commissioner Ervin Burrell struggles to meet Mayor Carcetti's crime reduction target while implementing budget cuts. He alienates Senator Davis by refusing to interfere in his corruption case. Carcetti intends to run for governor despite the city's fiscal difficulties, which he accepts because he can't fix schooling and crime problems at the same time without asking for money from Annapolis. State Delegate Odell Watkins expresses disappointment in Carcetti's priorities. Freamon still works the Davis case, but also spends his own time watching known Stanfield meeting places. McNulty desperately wants to return to the Stanfield case and is increasingly frustrated in Homicide. Freamon and McNulty try to get federal support, but their proposal is shot down by the U.S. Attorney. The detectives bitterly drown their sorrows with Bunk Moreland afterward.

When McNulty and Bunk are assigned a probable overdose, McNulty begins drinking and deliberately stages the body and the scene to suggest that the victim was murdered. McNulty tells Bunk that he plans to create the illusion of a serial killer with the intent of compelling City Hall to better fund the BPD in response to public pressure. Bunk wants no part of it and leaves in disgust.

Production

Guest stars

Frankie Faison as Ervin Burrell
Wood Harris as Avon Barksdale
Steve Earle as Walon
Felicia Pearson as Felicia "Snoop" Pearson
Delaney Williams as Jay Landsman
Chris Ashworth as Sergei Malatov
Genevieve Hudson-Price as Dee-Dee
Frederick Strother as Odell Watkins
Benay Berger as Amanda Reese
Doug Olear as Terrence "Fitz" Fitzhugh
Joseph Urla as Maryland District US Attorney
David Costabile as Thomas Klebanow
Sam Freed as James Whiting
Donald Neal as Jay Spry
Bobby J. Brown as Bobby Brown
Anthony Mangano as Kevin Infante
Kristie Dale Sanders as Nancy Porter
Gregory L. Williams as Michael Crutchfield
Bruce Kirkpatrick as Roger Twigg
Thomas J. McCarthy as Tim Phelps
Kara Quick as Rebecca Corbett
Todd Scofield as Jeff Price
Darrell Britt-Gibson as O-Dog
Kwame Patterson as Monk Metcalf
Scott Shane as Scott Shane
Suzanne Wooton as Suzanne Wooton
Willa Bickham as Willa Bickham
Dan Manning as Assistant Medical Examiner
Kate Revelle as Jane
Kelley Slagle as Assistant Medical Examiner
Brendan Walsh as Brendan Walsh
Erica Chamblee as Pregnant Mother
Lee Everett Cox as Aaron Castor
Rachel Lynn Dinenna as unknown
Frank McPartland as Angry fan
Andrew Roth as Tim Packard
Tasha R. Rudolph as Abusive mother
Andrew Cruttenden as unknown
Ayoka Dorsey as Gus' wife
Tyson Hall as Marvin
Adrienne Meisel as Recovering addict
Patricia Penn as Sun staff member
Steve Zettler as Prison guard

Uncredited roles

 Curt Boushell as Andy, Sun copy editor
 Louis Stancil as Unknown corner boy

References

External links
"Unconfirmed Reports" at HBO.com

The Wire (season 5) episodes
2008 American television episodes
Television episodes directed by Ernest Dickerson